The men's 200 metre freestyle event at the 2016 Summer Olympics took place between 7–8 August at the Olympic Aquatics Stadium. There were 47 competitors from 36 nations.

Summary
After a runner-up feat in the 400 m freestyle two days earlier, China's Sun Yang put up a monumental effort for the Olympic mid-distance freestyle title in a race against Chad le Clos of South Africa and Conor Dwyer of the United States. Hanging with the leaders at the 150-metre turn, Sun made a late charge on the final lap to edge out Le Clos in front and did not let Dwyer pass him for the gold medal in 1:44.65. Despite his early jump to the immediate lead before the final stretch, Le Clos could not hold off Sun to finish with a silver and an African record time in 1:45.20. Meanwhile, Dwyer powered home with a bronze in 1:45.23. Sun was the sixth man to win multiple medals in the event. Le Clos's silver was South Africa's first medal in the men's 200 metre freestyle.

Swimming on the outside lane, 2015 World champion James Guy of Great Britain improved upon his position to finish fourth with a 1:45.49. Dwyer's teammate Townley Haas claimed the fifth spot in 1:45.58, while Germany's world record holder Paul Biedermann (1:45.84), Japan's Kosuke Hagino (1:45.90), the Olympic champion in the 400 m individual medley, and Russia's Aleksandr Krasnykh (1:45.91) rounded out the field.

Other notable swimmers featured France's Yannick Agnel, who missed a chance to defend his Olympic title after fading to nineteenth in the prelims with a 1:47.35, and two-time silver medalist Park Tae-hwan of South Korea, who posted a twenty-ninth-place time of 1:48.06 in his fourth Olympic appearance. Shortly after the Games, Agnel, aged 24, officially confirmed his retirement from international swimming.

The medals for the competition were presented by Tsunekazu Takeda, Japan, member of the International Olympic Committee and the gifts were presented by Kazuo Sano, Bureau Member of FINA.

Background

This was the 15th appearance of the 200 metre freestyle event. It was first contested in 1900. It would be contested a second time, though at 220 yards, in 1904. After that, the event did not return until 1968; since then, it has been on the programme at every Summer Games.

Five of the 8 finalists from the 2012 Games returned: gold medalist Yannick Agnel of France, silver medalists Sun Yang of China and Park Tae-hwan of South Korea, fifth-place finisher Paul Biedermann of Germany, and seventh-place finisher Thomas Fraser-Holmes of Australia. Agnel had won the 2013 World Championship; James Guy of Great Britain had won in 2015. Sun was favoured, having had the strongest season so far in 2016.

Antigua and Barbuda, Aruba, Jordan, Palestine, and Samoa each made their debut in the event. Australia made its 15th appearance, the only nation to have competed in all prior editions of the event.

Qualification

Each National Olympic Committee (NOC) could enter up to two swimmers if both met the Olympic Qualifying Time (or "OQT"). An NOC with no swimmers meeting the OQT but at least one swimmer meeting the Olympic Selection Time (or "OST") was not guaranteed a place, but was eligible for selection to fill the overall 900 swimmer quota for the Games. For 2016, the OQT was 1:47.97 while the OST was 1:51.75. The qualifying window was 1 March 2015 to 3 July 2016; only approved meets (generally international competitions and national Olympic trials) during that period could be used to meet the standards. There were also universality places available; if no male swimmer from a nation qualified in any event, the NOC could enter one male swimmer in an event.

The two swimmers per NOC limit had been in place since the 1984 Games.

Competition format

The competition followed the format established in 2000, with three rounds: heats, semifinals, and a final. The advancement rule followed the format introduced in 1952. A swimmer's place in the heat was not used to determine advancement; instead, the fastest times from across all heats in a round were used. The top 16 swimmers from the heats advanced to the semifinals. The top 8 semifinalists advanced to the final. Swim-offs were used as necessary to break ties.

This swimming event used freestyle swimming, which means that the method of the stroke is not regulated (unlike backstroke, breaststroke, and butterfly events). Nearly all swimmers use the front crawl or a variant of that stroke. Because an Olympic-size swimming pool is 50 metres long, this race consisted of four lengths of the pool.

Records

Prior to this competition, the existing world and Olympic records were as follows.

Schedule

All times are Brasilia Time (UTC-3)

Results

Heats

The heats began at 1:19pm.

* Qualified, but pulled out of semi-finals to focus on  freestyle relay.

Semifinals

Final

References

Men's 00200 metre freestyle
Olympics
200 metre freestyle at the Olympics
Men's events at the 2016 Summer Olympics